Château de Barfleur was a castle in Barfleur, Normandy, France.

History
The Norman Earls of Chester held a castle at Barfleur in the 12th century. The city fortifications were demolished in the 16th century by Jacques de Goyon, Marshall of France under orders from Henry III of France.

Citations

References
 
 

Châteaux in Manche